San Cristoforo (in local dialect San Cristòfi) is a comune (municipality) in the Province of Alessandria in the Italian region Piedmont, located about  southeast of Turin and about  southeast of Alessandria.

San Cristoforo borders the following municipalities: Capriata d'Orba, Castelletto d'Orba, Francavilla Bisio, Gavi, Montaldeo, and Parodi Ligure.

History 
Situated on an important via of communication that it carried to the ancient city of Libarna, it rose around to a sight tower: the so-called Tower of the Gazzolo, today encompassed in the castle. Preemption of the Obertenghi, passed in 1313 in fief to the Spinola di Luccoli, for disposition of Enrico VII emperor. The village had more times, and occupied in the 1625 from the troops franc-savoiarde and in the 1654 from the piemontesi. In the 16th century it passed to the Doria, like imperial fief until 1732, when becoming sabaudo.

Castle 
The castle of the Spinola is built from a complex of buildings hedged by walls, in which the parochial church is comprised. The castle is a quadrilateral hedged by a ditch, built around to the ancient tower of the Gazzolo. To the west of the castle, the Casa Lunga (long house), building of the 15th century, today are used like building of representation of the comune (municipality), whereas to east the foresteria (guest quarters) is situated, a time connected through a passage to the nail head of the parochial church. This church is dedicated to martyr S.Cristoforo, it is built of the 15th century, but redecorated and widened in the 1800, conserve three statues dedicated to Nostra Signora del Carmelo, to San Cristoforo and to Madonna del S. Rosario.

Demographic evolution

References

Cities and towns in Piedmont